The Association of Art Museum Directors (AAMD) is an organization of art museum directors from the United States, Canada, and Mexico.

The AAMD was established in 1916 by the directors of twelve American museums and was formally incorporated in 1969. It currently has 220 members.

The Association of Art Museum Directors aims "to support its members in increasing the contribution of art museums to society" by promoting professional standards of practice, facilitating education, and advocating for museums.

AAMD's policies and guidelines are developed by its members and it issues publications that prescribe professional practices, from accessioning and deaccessioning, to ethics  and censorship.

See also 
List of female art museum directors
List of museums

References

External links
 Association website
 Los Angeles Times on AAMD's stance on deaccessioning
 New York Times on AAMD's stance on the acquisition of archaeological material and ancient art

Arts organizations based in New York City
Arts organizations based in Washington, D.C.
Arts organizations established in 1916
1916 establishments in the United States
Art museum people
Museum directors